Winter Songs is an EP by Matt Pond PA.

Track listing
All songs written by Matt Pond PA except as noted. 
"Snow Day" – 3:32
"Fall Two" – 1:33
"Winterlong" (Neil Young) – 3:17
"Winter One" – 1:09
"I Want To See The Bright Lights Tonight" (Richard & Linda Thompson) – 3:07
"Holiday Road" (Lindsey Buckingham) – 3:39
"In The Aeroplane Over The Sea" (Neutral Milk Hotel) – 3:58

Artwork by Jeffery T. Jones and Miriam Kienle.

Personnel
Eve Miller – cello, vocals
Brian Pearl – guitar, keyboards, bass
Dan Crowell – drums, dancing
Matthew Pond – guitar, vocals
Louie Lino – keyboards, guitars, vocals
Eric Ellogen – bass
Will Levatino – bass

Technical personnel
Steve Fallone – mastering engineer

Uses in other media
The song "Snow Day" was featured in a holiday ad for Starbucks.
The cover of "In The Aeroplane Over The Sea" was used in the third episode of the third season of The O.C.

2005 EPs
Matt Pond PA EPs